Richard Jonckheere (born 20 January 1963), better known by his stage names Richard23 and Richard JK, is a Belgian musician.  He has been a member of Front 242 (which he joined in 1983) and was a founding member of Revolting Cocks (which he left in 1986, and later rejoined in 2016). He released the EP Free Tyson Free! with Jean-Pierre Everaerts and Marc Desmare, using the moniker Holy Gang, and two 12-inch singles in 1999/2000 as LaTchak (a collaboration with Everaerts).

Politics
In 2007, Jonckheere ran as a candidate in the Belgian general elections on behalf of the Ecolo party. In the district of Brussels-Halle-Vilvoorde, he finished fifteenth, with 1,936 (or 2.03%) of the votes.

References

External links
 Richard 23 at Discogs
 Richard 23 at MySpace

Musicians from Brussels
1963 births
Living people
Belgian industrial musicians
Belgian electronic musicians
Revolting Cocks members
Front 242 members